

Denmark
South Greenland – Carl Peter Holbøll, Inspector of South Greenland (1828–1856)

France
Martinique – Ange René Armand, Governor of Martinique (1836–1838)

Portugal
Angola – Manuel Bernardo Vidal, Governor-General of Angola (1837–1839)

United Kingdom
 Barbados and the Windward Islands - Evan John Murray MacGregor, Governor (1836-1841)
 Malta Colony – Henry Bouverie, Governor of Malta (1836–1843)
 New South Wales – Major George Gipps, Governor of New South Wales (1838–1846)
South Australia  
 Captain John Hindmarsh, Governor of South Australia (1836–1838)
 Lieutenant-Colonel George Gawler, Governor of South Australia (1838–1841)
Trinidad – Sir George Fitzgerald Hill, Governor of Trinidad (1833–1839)
 Western Australia – Captain James Stirling, Governor of Western Australia (1828–1839)

Colonial governors
Colonial governors
1838